Jonas Björkman was the defending champion, but lost in the second round to Jason Stoltenberg.

Àlex Corretja won the title, defeating Andre Agassi in the final 2–6, 6–2, 6–3.

Seeds
The top eight seeds received a bye into the second round.

Draw

Finals

Top half

Section 1

Section 2

Bottom half

Section 3

Section 4

References

Atlanta Open (tennis)
Singles